Energy in the Czech Republic describes energy and electricity production, consumption and import in the Czech Republic.

Overview

Primary energy consumption per million people in 2008 was 50 TWh compared to other countries (TWh): Canada 93 (3103 TWh 33.3), USA 87 (26,560 TWh 304.5), UK 40 (2,424 TWh 61.4), Greece 31 TWh (354 TWh 11.24) and Poland 30 (1138 TWh 38.12).

Fossil fuels

Coal 

OKD is a major mining company in the Czech Republic.

The country aims to phase out coal power by 2038 or earlier.

Oil and gas
Oil and gas deposits in the Czech Republic are in Moravia. Gas pipelines include Gazela Pipeline and Druzhba pipeline from Russia to points in Ukraine, Belarus, Poland, Hungary, Slovakia, Czech Republic, and Germany.

Electricity

Environment 

In 2014, the emissions of carbon dioxide were 10.4 tons per capita. The EU average was 7.9 tons per capita. Czech Republic's emissions were comparable to those of Japan or the Netherlands.

Business 
According to Forbes list of billionaires (2011) Czech billionaire Zdenek Bakala ($2 B 2011) has made his wealth in coal business. Forbes ranked Zdenek Bakala (Net Worth$1.5 B) as richest Czech in energy business (coal) in 2013.

Bakala is the biggest player on the coal market in Central Europe. He has consolidated Polish mining markets into his company New World Resources.

References

External links